Yamalak is a small town in the District of Kuyucak, Aydın Province, Turkey. As of 2010 it had a population of 1952 people. The Battle of Antioch on the Meander took place close to the town.

References

Villages in Kuyucak District